Akii ibhadode (born September 13, 1957) is a Nigerian academic. He became the third substantive Vice-Chancellor of the Federal University of Petroleum Resources Effurun on April 14–15, 2015 by the council of the University, and handed over to Prof Akpofure Rim-Rukeh in 2020.

Early life
Ibhadode obtained his first degree from the University of Lagos with a first class in Mechanical Engineering in 1981.

References

1957 births
Living people
Vice-Chancellors of Nigerian universities
Nigerian mechanical engineers